The 2021–22 season is Ross County's third consecutive season in the Scottish Premiership and the club's 9th season overall in the top flight of Scottish football. Ross County will also compete in the Scottish Cup and Scottish League Cup. Malky Mackay was appointed as the club's manager on 26 May 2021.

Results and fixtures

Pre-season

Scottish Premiership

League table

Matches

Scottish Cup

Matches

League Cup

Ross County's first two group stage matches were forfeited due to a COVID-19 outbreak in their squad leaving them unable to field a team.

Matches

Squad statistics

Captains

Appearances
As of 14 May 2022

|-
|colspan="10"|Players who left the club during the season
|-

|-
|}

Goalscorers

Transfers

In

Out

Notes and references

2021-22
Ross County